Sibiromycin is an antitumor antibiotic with the molecular formula C24H33N3O7 which is produced by the bacterium Streptosporangium sibiricum. Sibiromycin is a pyrrolobenzodiazepine.

References

Further reading 

 
 
 

antibiotics
Sibiromycin